L'Orione (Orion) is an opera in three acts and a prologue by the Italian composer Francesco Cavalli with a libretto by Francesco Melosio. It was first performed at the Royal Theatre, Milan, in June 1653 to celebrate the election of Ferdinand IV as King of the Romans. The libretto had originally been written for the Teatro San Moisè, Venice, in 1642. Orione was revived in Santa Fe, New Mexico, in 1983 by the conductor and musicologist Raymond Leppard.

Roles

References
Source
Brenac, Jean-Claude, Le magazine de l'opéra baroque at perso.orange.fr. Retrieved 9 September 2011.

Operas
Operas by Francesco Cavalli
Operas based on classical mythology
Italian-language operas
1653 operas